The Aru Islands Regency is a group of about 95 low-lying islands in the Maluku Islands of eastern Indonesia. At the 2011 Census the Regency had a population of 84,138; the 2020 Census produced a total of 102,237. Some sources regard the archipelago as part of Asia, while others regard it as part of Melanesia.

Administration 
At the time of the 2010 Census, the regency was divided into seven districts (kecamatan), but subsequently an additional three districts have been created by the splitting of existing districts. The districts are tabulated below with their areas (in km2) and their populations at the 2010 Census and 2020 Census. The table also includes the locations of the district administrative centres, the number of villages (desa) in each district, and its postal code.

Notes: (a) the 2010 population of Aru Utara Timur Batuley and Sir-Sir Districts are included in the figure for Aru Utara District, from which they were split. (b) the 2010 population of Aru Selatan Utara District is included in the figures for the districts from which it was split.

Geography

The islands are the easternmost in Maluku province, and are located in the Arafura Sea southwest of New Guinea and north of Australia. The total area of the islands is 6,426.77 km2 (2,481.39 sq mi). The largest island is Tanahbesar (also called Wokam); Dobo, the chief port of the islands, is on Wamar, just off Tanahbesar. The other five main islands are Kola, Kobroor, Maikoor, Koba, and Trangan. The main islands rise to low hills, and are separated by meandering channels. Geologically, the group is part of the Australian continent, along with New Guinea, Tasmania, Waigeo, and Raja Ampat on the Australian Plate.

Aru is covered by a mix of tropical moist broadleaf forests, savanna, and mangroves. The islands lie on the Australia-New Guinea continental shelf, and were connected to Australia and New Guinea by land when sea levels were lower during the ice ages. The flora and fauna of Aru are part of the Australasian realm, and closely related to that of New Guinea. Aru is part, together with much of western New Guinea, of the Vogelkop-Aru lowland rain forests terrestrial ecoregion.

As part of the political and administrative decentralization of Indonesia since Suharto stepped down in 1998, the Aru Islands are now a separate residency (kabupaten), headquartered at Dobo, split off from the residency of Central Maluku.

Economy

Throughout its history, the Aru Islands exported luxury natural products like birds-of-paradise, turtle shells, and pearls to Asia and later Europe. While the islands were positioned within the global trade network, local Aru society was able to preserve its independence and egalitarianism.

Pearl farming continues to provide a major source of income for the islands. The Aru pearl industry has been criticized in the national media for allegedly maintaining exploitative debt structures that bind the local men who dive for pearls to outside boat owners and traders in an unequal relationship.

Other export products include sago, coconuts, tobacco, mother of pearl, trepang (an edible sea cucumber, which is dried and cured), tortoiseshell, and bird-of-paradise plumes.

BP plans to acquire seismic data over the two blocks.

History

The Aru Islands have a long history as a part of extensive trading networks throughout what is now eastern Indonesia. Precolonial links were especially strong to the Banda Islands, and Bugis and Makasarese traders also visited regularly. The traditional society was not pronounced hierarchical, being based on lineage-based clans where the members shared duties of hospitality and cooperation. These island communities were divided into two ritual bonds called Ursia and Urlima, a socio-political system found in many parts of Maluku. Such alliances were connected to pre-European trade networks.

The islands were sighted and also possibly visited by some Portuguese navigators, such as Martim Afonso de Melo, in 1522–24, who sighted the islands and wintered on a nearby island or of the Aru archipelago itself, and possibly by Gomes de Sequeira, in 1526, as is pointed out in the cartography of the time. The Spanish navigator Álvaro de Saavedra sighted the islands on 12 June 1528, when trying to return from Tidore to New Spain.

The islands were colonized by the Dutch, beginning with a contract with the west coast villages in 1623, though initially the Dutch East India Company (VOC) was one of several trading groups in the area, with limited influence over the islands' internal affairs. Aru was monitored by the VOC establishment in the Banda Islands, and yielded a variety of products including trepang, birds-of-paradise, parrots, pearls, sago, turtle-shell, and slaves. A Dutch post was established on Wokam Island in 1659, and a small fort was subsequently constructed there. Islam as well as Reformed Protestantism began to make small numbers of converts in the 1650s. Discontent with the commercial monopolies imposed by the VOC came to a boiling point in the late 18th century. The anti-Dutch rebellion of the Tidore prince Nuku (d. 1805), which engulfed much of Maluku, also affected Aru. The Muslim population of Ujir Island accepted Nuku's brother Jou Mangofa as their king, exterminated the Dutch garrison in 1787, and were able to dominate large parts of the islands. After several failed attempts, the Dutch of Banda managed to suppress the rebels in 1791. However, they soon ran into new trouble with the coastal populations in the east, and their control of Aru affairs was disrupted by British intervention in the East Indies after 1795.

After being left to its own devices for many years, Aru was again visited in 1824 by the Dutch naval officer A.J. Bik, who concluded a number of agreements with local chiefs. In 1857 the famous naturalist Alfred Russel Wallace visited the islands. His visit later made him realize that the Aru Islands must have been connected by a land bridge to mainland New Guinea during the ice age.

In the nineteenth century, Dobo, Aru's largest town, temporarily became an important regional trading center, serving as a meeting point for Dutch, Makasarese, Chinese, and other traders. The period from the 1880s to 1917 saw a backlash against this outside influence, by a spiritually-based movement among local residents to rid the islands of outsiders.

Demographics

The islands had a population of 84,138 at the 2010 Census; the 2020 Census produced a total of 102,237. Most indigenous islanders are of mixed Austronesian and Papuan descent. Fourteen languages - Barakai, Batuley, Dobel, Karey, Koba, Kola, Kompane, Lola, Lorang, Manombai, Mariri, East Tarangan, West Tarangan, and Ujir - are indigenous to Aru. They belong to the Central Malayo-Polynesian languages, and are related to the other languages of Maluku, Nusa Tenggara, and Timor. Ambonese Malay is also spoken on Wamar. All are members of the Austronesian language family.

The population is mostly Christian with a small Muslim minority. Figures cited by Glenn Dolcemascolo for 1993 were approximately 90% Protestant, 6% Catholic, and 4% Muslim. A more recent report from 2007 suggested that the 4% Muslim figure may only relate to the indigenous population and that the actual percentage of Muslims may be significantly higher.

In 2010 census, religion Popolatian consists Protestant (59.84%), Catholic (9.32%), Muslim (29.97%), Hinduism (0.05%), Buddhist (0.03%), Confucianism (0.02%), Other (0.01%), and not asked (0.75%).

Islam is thought to have been introduced to the islands in the late 15th century. By the early 17th century, it was reported by the Dutch that Makassarese seafarers had converted some locals and constructed mosques. However, it only took root in the mid-17th century, primarily in the Ujir-speaking territory on the western side.

The Dutch brought Christianity in the 17th and 18th centuries but much of the conversion of the population to Christianity did not take place until the 20th century.

See also
 Islands of Indonesia
 Aru languages

Notes

References

Hans Hägerdal and Susi Moeimam, eds (2019). Society and history in Central and Southern Maluku, Wacana; Journal of the Humanities of Indonesia Vol. 20, Issue 3.
Patricia Spyer (2000), The memory of trade: Modernity's entanglements on an eastern Indonesian island. Durham: Duke University Press.

External links
J.G.F. Riedel (1886). De sluik- en kruisharige rassen tussen Selebes en Papua. The Hague: Nijhoff, p. 244-271.
Pieter Bleeker (1858). "De Aroe-eilanden, in vroeger tijd en tegenwoordig", Tijdschrift voor Nederlandsch Indië 20:1, p. 257-275.

 
Arafura Sea
Archipelagoes of Indonesia
Islands of the Maluku Islands
Landforms of Maluku (province)
Regencies of Maluku (province)
1623 establishments in the Dutch Empire